Manakamana is a village development committee in Nuwakot District in the Bagmati Zone of central Nepal. At the time of the 1991 Nepal census, it had a population of 3047 people living in 604 individual households.

References

External links 
UN map of the municipalities of Nuwakot District

Populated places in Nuwakot District